White County High School may refer to:

White County High School (Cleveland, Georgia), United States
White County High School (Sparta, Tennessee), United States